George Ellis Aickin (1869 – 4 August 1937) was a British Anglican priest in Australia, where he ended his career as Dean of Melbourne 1927–1932.

Biography
Aickin was born in Liverpool in 1869, educated at Liverpool College and St John’s College, Cambridge,  and  ordained in 1895. He received an MA from St John's College, Cambridge, in February 1902. After curacies in Wargrave, Ravenhead and Darwen he became the Chaplain at St Aidan’s College, Birkenhead. After an incumbency at Upton  he emigrated to Australia. He was Principal of Ridley College, Melbourne, from 1910 to 1918; Archdeacon of Bendigo from 1918 to 1919; Archdeacon of Dandenong from 1919 to 1932; and Dean of Melbourne from 1927 to 1932.

He died on 4 August 1937.

References

1869 births
Clergy from Merseyside
People educated at Liverpool College
Alumni of St John's College, Cambridge
Anglican archdeacons in Australia
Deans of Melbourne
1937 deaths